The Elz is a small river in Baden-Württemberg, Germany, a right tributary of the Neckar. It rises in the Odenwald.  The Elz flows through Mudau, Limbach and Mosbach before reaching the Neckar in Neckarelz, a borough of Mosbach. Its length is 40 kilometres.

Tributaries and Lakes 
(River length according to LUBW online map )
 Eisengraben, left tributary, 2.4km 
 Wasserrausch, left tributary, 2.3 km 
 Steinigsbächlein, left tributary, meets the Elz in (Mittel-)Langenelz, 0.9 km
 Seeschlagbächlein, left tributary, 1.3 km
 Einbach, left tributary, 2.6 km 
 unnamed creek, right tributary, 2.5 km
 Landgraben, left tributary, 5.4 km 
 unnamed creek, right tributary, 2.4 km 
 Guckenbach, left tributary, meets the Elz in Rittersbach, 4.7 km
 Muckbach, right tributary, 3.8 km
 unnamed creek, right tributary, 1.4 km
 Auerbach, left tributary, 5.7 km 
 unnamed creek, right tributary, 0.7 km
 Luttenbach, left tributary, 2.4 km 
 Danterquellgraben, left tributary,
 Trienzbach, right tributary, 19.1 km 
 unnamed creek, left tributary, 0.6 km 
 Klingengraben, right tributary, 2.8 km
 Hasbach, right tributary, 3.6 km 
 Wolfsgraben, right tributary, 1.7 km
 unnamed creek, left tributary,1.3 km
 unnamed creek, left tributary, 1.7 km
 unnamed creek, left tributary, 2.1 km
 Nüstenbach, right tributary, 5.2 km

References

Rivers of Baden-Württemberg
Rivers of Germany